Chokha was an early 19th-century painter of Rajasthan in India. He was the son of Bakta, also a painter, and produced works for both the courts of Mewar and Devgarh.

Gallery

References

External links

Indian male painters
19th-century Indian painters
Painters from Rajasthan
19th-century Indian male artists